Saphobius inflatipes is one of a number of species of dung beetle that are endemic to New Zealand. It is in the tribe Deltochilini of the family Scarabaeidae. It was first described by Thomas Broun in 1893. Within the Auckland region, it is most abundant over the summer and autumn seasons.

References

External links

 Citizen science observations

Beetles of New Zealand
Beetles described in 1893
Endemic fauna of New Zealand
Deltochilini
Endemic insects of New Zealand